Meninatherium is a poorly understood extinct genus of Asian rhinoceros. It is known only from an Upper Oligocene European type specimen which was destroyed during World War II.

References 

Oligocene rhinoceroses
Oligocene mammals of Europe
Prehistoric monotypic mammal genera